All-4-One is the eponymous debut album by All-4-One released on April 12, 1994. It features the Grammy-award-winning hit single, "I Swear".

Singles
"So Much in Love" – 1993
"I Swear" – April 28, 1994
"Something About You" – 1994
"Breathless" – September 6, 1994
"(She's Got) Skillz" – January 24, 1995
"A Better Man" – 1995

Track listing

The CD released by Atlantic Records had two versions of the song "So Much In Love". The version of "So Much in Love" that is included on the Atlantic Records version, but not on the version released by Blitzz Records, is an extended version with a runtime of 4:18.

Personnel
Adapted from the All-4-One liner notes.

All-4-One
Jamie Jones, Delious Kennedy, Alfred Nevarez, Tony Borowiak: All Vocals

Artwork
Julio Estrada: Photography

Production
Gary St. Clair, Tim O'Brien: Producers
David Foster: Producer (*)
DJ Gil: Co-producer (**)
Tim O'Brien: Executive producer
Carl Wurlz (+), Rick Kellis (++): Arrangements
Steve McDonald: Engineer
Jazz, Scott Campbell, Dave Reitzas: Additional engineering
Ken Kessie: Mix engineer
Bravo, Cornerstone, Dickerson Recording, CAN-AM Recorders, Inc., Rumbo Recorders: Recording studios
Chris Bellman: Mastering (Bernie Grundman Mastering)
JB: Production coordinator

Charts

Weekly charts

Year-end charts

Certifications

References

1994 debut albums
All-4-One albums
Atlantic Records albums
Albums produced by David Foster